KQCT-LP was a low-power television station licensed to Davenport, Iowa. The station had previously broadcast an analog signal on UHF channel 61.

TBN took the former K61HD silent March 30, 2010 due to declining support, which has been attributed to the digital transition.  On May 4, 2012, the callsign for this station changed from the previous translator-style calls K61HD to the current KQCT-LP, following its sale to its current owners, Luken Communications, which owns the station through its Digital Networks subsidiary.

KQCT-LP was scheduled to turn on its digital signal, and be affiliated with Retro Television Network. It was seen before on WHBF-TV, on its digital subchannel of 4.2, before being replaced by Live Well Network. However, the station's license was cancelled on December 22, 2021, without ever being licensed for digital operation.

References

External links

Television stations in Iowa
Television stations in Illinois
Television stations in the Quad Cities
1987 establishments in Iowa
Television channels and stations established in 1987
Defunct television stations in the United States
2021 disestablishments in Iowa
Television channels and stations disestablished in 2021
Defunct mass media in Iowa